51 Birch Street is a 2005 documentary film about the universal themes of love, marriage, fidelity, and the mystery of a suburban family. It was directed by Doug Block.

Synopsis
51 Birch Street is the first-person account of a family's life-changing events. A few months after his mother's sudden death from pneumonia, Doug Block's 83-year-old father, Mike, calls him to announce that he’s moving to Florida to live with "Kitty", his secretary from 40 years before. Always close to his mother and equally distant from his father, Doug and his two older sisters were shocked and suspicious.

When Mike and Kitty marry and sell the Block family home, Doug returns to suburban Long Island for one last visit. Among the mementos being packed away, Doug discovers three large boxes filled with his mother's daily diaries going back 35 years in which she recorded her unhappiness, her rage against her husband, her sexual fantasies about her therapist, a brief affair with an unnamed friend of her husband—and her suspicions about Kitty. The marriage, Mike told Doug on film, "was not loving, it was a functioning association". With only a few weeks before the movers come and his father leaves, Doug is determined to explore his parents' marriage.

Through conversations with family members and friends and surprising diary revelations, Doug finally comes to peace with his parents who are more complex and troubled than he ever imagined. The documentary explores more subtle forms of repression, secrecy and denial within a family, and confirms the complexity of marriage.

Response 
The New York Times film critic A.O. Scott said the film was "one of the most moving and fascinating documentaries I’ve seen this year", and listed it as one of his ten favorite films of the year.  Jim Emerson of  RogerEbert.com  named 51 Birch Street one of the top ten films of 2006. By December 10, 2006, the film had grossed $84,689.

References

External links
 
 http://www.thekidsgrowup.com/the-filmmakers/
 https://www.nytimes.com/2010/10/24/movies/24kids.html?pagewanted=all

American documentary films
2005 films
Films directed by Doug Block
2005 documentary films
Documentary films about families
2000s English-language films
2000s American films